Uçarı is a village in Anamur district of Mersin Province, Turkey. It is situated in the Toros Mountains on Turkish state highway  which connects Mersin to Antalya. The population of Uçarı is 371  as of 2011.

References

Villages in Anamur District